Idmon is a genus of grass skippers in the family Hesperiidae.

Species
Idmon bicolora XL. Fan & M. Wang, 2007
Idmon distanti (Shepard, 1937)
Idmon flavata XL. Fan & M. Wang, 2007
Idmon fujianana (Chou & Huang, 1994)
Idmon latifascia (Elwes & Edwards, 1897)
Idmon obliquans (Mabille, 1893)
Idmon sinica (H. Huang, 1997)

References

Natural History Museum Lepidoptera genus database
 , 2007, Zootaxa 1510: 57–62. 
 , 1997: Yania gen. nov., and Yania sinica sp. nov. from Sichuan, China (Lepidoptera: Hesperiidae). Journal of Research on the Lepidoptera 34: 147–153. Full article: .

Ancistroidini
Butterflies of Indochina
Hesperiidae genera